Daniel Timothy Wenas (born 8 August 1992) is an Indonesian professional basketball player that currently plays for Amartha Hangtuah of the Indonesian Basketball League (IBL). He mainly plays Point Guard and Shooting Guard and on occasion, also plays the Small Forward position. Wenas attended Negeri 03 Jakarta of high school for his high school and played for at Perbanas Institute university where he was a member of their basketball team from 2011 to 2016. He was also recruited and played professionally for Pelita Jaya Esia during his time at Perbanas.

Early career

Wenas started playing basketball at the age of 13. In 2005, he joined Bulls Jakarta a junior basketball club to start his junior career and was a member there for three years until 2008. In 2008, he joined Merah-Putih Jakarta and stayed there for a year. In 2009, he then recruited by his future professional team, Pelita Jaya's Junior Team and was promoted to the main team in 2011 during his freshman year at University.

High school career

Wenas attended Negeri 03 Jakarta of high school where he led his team to first place in  U-16 Kejurnas  in 2007 and 2008 and in U-18 Kejurnas in 2009 as a junior. He also led his team to first place for the annual  Pop-Mie Basketball National Championship  from 2007 to 2009.

Sophomore year
In 2008 during his sophomore season, his team went to the final and played against Negeri 09 Bandung of high school from Bandung. Despite falling behind during the first quarter, Negeri 03 Jakarta of high school under their coach Julisa Rastafari broke through and came out victorious with the final score of 74-61 and grabbed the 2008 Pop-Mie Basketball National Championship.

Junior year
In 2009 Wenas and his team  played in the final and were matched against Ananda high school of Batam from Batam at the famous BritAma Arena. Negeri 03 Jakarta of high school's defense was exploited and the score was even at 41 at half time. However, Negeri 03 Jakarta of high school closed out the game with an 82-81 win through Prastawa game winning free-throw, and grab the 2009 Pop-Mie Basketball National Championship.

Senior year
Wenas returned to Negeri 03 Jakarta of high school in 2010 to complete his education. Despite still being in the basketball team, he and the other senior members were not allowed to participate in national competition to focus on their academics. During this time, he was also selected to Indonesia National Team for Asean School Games 2010.

Professional career

Pelita Jaya Esia (2011–2014)

Rookie Season (2011–12)
Wenas was immediately recruited to play professionally for Pelita Jaya after graduating high school and during his freshman year at Perbanas Institute. He made his professional debut on 11 December 2011 against JNE Bandung Utama and scored 8 points together with 8 rebounds, 1 assist and 2 steals in 16 minutes. He scored a season high 17 points 118–64 victory on 1 February 2012 against NSH Jakarta. He finished his rookie season averaging 5.7 points, 2.6 rebounds, 0.8 assist, 0.8 steal and 0.1 block, playing mainly as the backup Small-Forward for the team.

2012-13 Season
Wenas returned to Pelita Jaya for his second season and scored a season high 18 points again, against NSH Jakarta on 16 January 2013 and brought his team to a 73-38 blowout win. He ended the regular season with an average of 5.6 points, 1.8 rebounds, 0.45 assist, 0.45 steal, and 0.08 block. He then helped his team reach the 2013 NBL Final to play against Aspac Jakarta led by his former high-school teammate, the rookie of the year, Andakara Prastawa. During the final, Wenas only played 10 minutes and scored 4 points as his team was eliminated with the score of 50 to 63.

Injury-Plagued Season (2013-14)
During a daily practice in late August 2013, Wenas suffered a torn ACL and lateral meniscus and had to miss the whole of the upcoming season. He had a surgery done in early September at Moro Lorenzo Sports Center @ Ateneo de Manila University located at Quezon City, Philippines.

Garuda Bandung (2014–2016)

Comeback Season (2014-15)
After missing the whole of 2013–14 season, Wenas signed with a new team Garuda Bandung. He made his debut for Garuda on 3 December 2014 against Pacific Caesar Surabaya scoring 6 points off the bench. Later that month, Wenas was selected to Indonesian National Team to compete in 2014 ASEAN University Games at Palembang, Indonesia. Wenas helped Indonesia to win the gold medal by defeating Thailand in the gold medal match. He scored a career high, 23 points and made 4 out of his 6 3-point attempts to beat Hangtuah Sumsel with the final score of 67–52. He finished the season averaging 6.3 points, 2.8 rebounds, 1 assist, 0.8 steals and 0.2 block. Garuda entered the playoff as the fifth seed and was matchup against the fourth-seeded Aspac Jakarta in the first round. Garuda was defeated by Aspac 51–68. They then played against Stadium Jakarta in the losing bracket before losing to them 52-58 and thus eliminated from the playoff.

Transitioning to Indonesian Basketball League (2015-16)
The 2015–16 season was a transitional season for the Indonesian's professional basketball league as they re-branded themselves back to Indonesian Basketball League. Development Basketball League (DBL) discontinued their management rights of the league. PERBASI then appointed Starting5 Sports Entertainment to manage the league and hired Hasan Gozali as the commissioner of the new league. It was during this year that Wenas started transitioning from his usual small forward position to playing both guard positions. His coach, Fictor Roring occasionally trusted Wenas to run the team offense as their backup point guard behind the veteran, Wendha Wijaya. On 29 April 2016, Wenas scored a career high 24 points and career high 6 steals to go along with 8 rebounds and 4 assists. With high expectation, Garuda entered the playoffs as the 5th seed with a 22–11 record and were matched up against the 4th seeded Satria Muda Pertamina Jakarta team that was led by Arki Wisnu. Garuda however was eliminated in two games in a best-of-three format.

Return to Pelita Jaya (2016–2018)

All-Star & Championship season (2016-17)
Towards the end of the off-season of 2016, Wenus requested a trade to his old team, Pelita Jaya. It was no longer possible for Wenas to stay with Garuda from his financial standpoint. He was then traded to Pelita Jaya for future all-star, Januar Kuntara. Wenas was joined by his old coach, Fictor Roring as he was hired by Pelita Jaya to be the General Manager of the team.
This was also the year where IBL finally allowed each team to draft 2 foreign players. Pelita Jaya used their picks to draft a guard, Martavious Irving from Kansas State University and Kore White from University of South Florida. That year, Wenas experienced a decline in almost all of his statistics as he took a lesser role than when he was during his time with Garuda Bandung. His team however, entered the playoff as the first seed in the White Group and was immediately qualify to play in the Group Stage Final. Wenas helped his team to swept Aspac Jakarta in 2 games and went on to face the Red Group's champion, Satria Muda Pertamina Jakarta in the final. Pelita Jaya won game one, 63 to 57 however, they lost game two and with the season on the line, Pelita Jaya willed themselves to win the series 72 to 62 against their long-time rival and winning their first ever championship at the IBL-NBL Era.

Return to the Final (2017-18)
Building the success from the previous season, Wenas and his team went on to the United States for training camp at Impact Basketball that was located at Las Vegas, Nevada for one week. Despite winning the championship, Pelita Jaya decided not to bring back neither of their 2 foreign players from the previous season and used their draft picks to draft a big-guard, Wayne Bradford from Davenport University and big man, Merril Holden from Iowa State University. Holden was however, replaced by e.x. Los Angeles Lakers's player, C. J. Giles during the off-season. During the same off-season, Pelita Jaya signed Xaverius Prawiro whom ended up becoming the MVP of the 2017-18 season and another valuable, versatile big man in Valentino Wuwungan. This season, Wenas was promoted as their starting Shooting Guard and started the season strongly, posting a consecutive double-double on 4 and 5 January 2018. His team won league's best 16–1 record and entered the playoff again as the first seed in the White Group. Wenas again faced Aspac, this time led by Kore White in the semi-final and nearly losing to them in an overtime game 3, elimination game. The final was a rematch from last year, however, this time Satria Muda Pertamina Jakarta was powered by Indonesia's naturalised national-team player, Jamarr Johnson and Dior Lowhorn whom defeated Wenas and his team in 3 games. During the playoff, Wenas did not score a single point throughout the entire playoff.

Bogor Siliwangi (2018–2019)

Breakout-season and club dismissal (2018-19)
During the off-season of 2018, Wenas weighed his options on whether to return to Pelita Jaya or sign with a new team. On 8 October 2018, Wenas announced his decision to join the newly, reformed Bogor Siliwangi whom had just relocated to Bogor from Bandung through his Youtube Channel. He explained that his primary reason for not renewing his contract with Pelita Jaya is to be able to get a bigger role and more playing time; something that Pelita Jaya will not be able to accommodate, especially after signing Wenas' old high school teammate, and the reigning Sixth-man of the Year in Andakara Prastawa. Despite Siliwangi being the worst team in the previous season with 0 win, Wenas believed that this will be a challenge worth taking and also an opportunity for him to prove himself that he can be a national-team level player. He performed very strongly during the pre-season with an average of 14.25 points, 9.0 rebounds and 3.25 assists to go with 1.75 steals in 32 minutes of playing time. He finished the season averaging career-high in points and minutes played, his team however, missed the playoff making this season the first time in Wenas' career to miss the post-season.
Wenas, along with all the members of Bogor Siliwangi became a free-agent in mid-2019 due to the club's dismissal. The cause of the dismissal was mainly due to financial and many of the players' salary were paid late.

Louvre Surabaya (2019–present)

New Chapter with a brand new team (2019-20)
After months of being a free-agent, speculations and discussion arose on which team Wenas will be playing for the upcoming season. Along with his free-agency, the league was transitioning into a new era with many of the older, more established team such as Stapac Jakarta withdrawing out due to not having enough experience player in their roster as many of the players were called to play for the national team. In late October, Louvre Surabaya, a new expansion team for Indonesian Basketball League officially announce Wenas as their first ever player and expected him to be the cornerstone of the new team. Wenas made his debut for Louvre during 2019 Indonesia President's cup.

International career 
Wenas made his national team debut when he was selected to Indonesia National Team for FIBA Asia U-18 in 2008. In 2010, he again represented Indonesia in ASEAN School Games. In September 2012, Wenas represented DKI Jakarta and won the bronze medal in the Pekan Olahraga Nasional XVIII (PON 18) national tournament.

He helped Indonesia to win the gold medals for both 2014 ASEAN University Games at Palembang and 2016 ASEAN University Games at Singapore, both times defeating Thailand in the final.

In February 2018, Wenas was selected to participate in 2018 Asian Games Test Event and made his official senior Indonesian National Team debut defeating Timor Leste 135–30. Indonesia managed to earn gold medal for the Test Event by beating India, 78–68 in the final.

Career statistics

Regular season

NBL/IBL

Playoffs

International 
{| class="wikitable sortable"
!Year
!Competition
!GP
!Min
!FG%
!3P%
!FT%
!APG
!RPG
!SPG
!BPG
!PPG
|-
|2014
|2014 ASEAN University Games
|5
|0.0
|0.0
|0.0
|0.0
|0.0
|0.0
|0.0
|0.0
|0.0
|-
|2016
|2016 ASEAN University Games
|5
|0.0
|0.0
|0.0
|0.0
|0.0
|0.0
|0.0
|0.0
|0.0
|-
|2018
|Test Event Asian Games 2018
|4
|0.0
|0.0
|0.0
|0.0
|0.0
|0.0
|0.0
|0.0
|0.0
|-
|- class="sortbottom"
| style="text-align:center;" colspan="2" | Career
|14.0
|0.0
|0.0
|0.0
|0.0
|0.0
|0.0
|0.0
|0.0
|0.0

References

External links
 Daniel Wenas
 Daniel Wenas

1992 births
Living people
Indonesian men's basketball players
Guards (basketball)
Sportspeople from Jakarta